José María Movilla Cubero (born 8 February 1975) is a Spanish retired professional footballer who played mainly as a central midfielder.

He played 299 La Liga matches in exactly ten seasons, representing mainly Zaragoza and retiring well into his 30s.

Club career
An unsuccessful graduate from Real Madrid's system, Madrid-born Movilla started his professional career with modest clubs: CD Colonia Moscardó, CD Numancia and CD Ourense. In January 1998 he switched to Málaga CF, being an instrumental figure in the Andalusia side's promotion from Segunda División B into La Liga in just two years.

Returning to Segunda División, Movilla joined Atlético Madrid, where he managed another promotion in the 2001–02 season while playing in all 38 games. He would arrive on loan to Real Zaragoza in January 2004, helping them avoid top flight relegation and win the Copa del Rey.

The move was made permanent subsequently, and Movilla played three additional campaigns with the Aragonese, after which he joined newly promoted Real Murcia. At the start of 2008–09, with the club now in the second division, he was, alongside Francisco Gallardo, ousted from the squad by coach Javier Clemente, only being reinstated after his sacking in December 2008.

On 4 July 2009, Movilla moved close to home as he signed a two-year contract with Rayo Vallecano. In his second, he was an instrumental player in a return to the top flight after eight years (41 matches, 3,269 minutes).

Movilla, who celebrated his 37th birthday in February, played all 38 league games in 2011–12, being essential as Rayo retained their division status. He scored the first of his two goals during the season in the opener against Athletic Bilbao, a 1–1 away draw.

Movilla returned to Zaragoza for 2012–13, signing for one year. On 4 January 2013, after a 1–2 home loss to Real Betis, he became the club's oldest player to make an official appearance at the age of 37 years and 332 days, surpassing Enrique Yarza as the campaign went on to end in relegation.

On 28 January 2014, after making negative remarks about the club's management in the social networks, Movilla was suspended for 30 days. He was released the following month alongside Javier Paredes, finding about the news through Zaragoza's website.

Honours
Zaragoza
Copa del Rey: 2003–04
Supercopa de España: 2004

Málaga
Segunda División: 1998–99

Atlético Madrid
Segunda División: 2001–02

References

External links

1975 births
Living people
Footballers from Madrid
Spanish footballers
Association football midfielders
La Liga players
Segunda División players
Segunda División B players
CD Numancia players
CD Ourense footballers
Málaga CF players
Atlético Madrid footballers
Real Zaragoza players
Real Murcia players
Rayo Vallecano players